Brizio Giustiniani (Genoa, 1713Genoa, 1778) was the 174th Doge of the Republic of Genoa.

Biography 
Giustiniani rose to power on 31 January 1775, the one hundred and twenty-ninth in biennial succession and the one hundred and seventy-fourth in republican history. The coronation ceremony at the Cathedral of San Lorenzo, due to the long indecisions of the new doge, judged by historians of the time to be of a reserved nature and not prone to pomp, took place five months after the official proclamation of the Grand Council. Brizio Giustiniani himself asked the speaker, a Cistercian abbot, not to mention his person in the inauguration speech. After his term of office on 31 January 1777 he held the roles of head of the war magistrate and then deputy of the Navy for the Republic of Genoa. At the age of 65, Giustiniani was murdered by Luiz Santomario in 1778 in his noble residence in Albaro.

See also 
 Republic of Genoa
 Doge of Genoa

References 

18th-century Doges of Genoa
1713 births
1778 deaths